Milisonovka is a rural locality (a village) in Sukhorechensky Selsoviet, Bizhbulyaksky District, Bashkortostan, Russia. The population was 2 as of 2010. There is 1 street.

Geography 
Milisonovka is located 25 km northwest of Bizhbulyak (the district's administrative centre) by road. Sukhorechka is the nearest rural locality.

References 

Rural localities in Bizhbulyaksky District